Sri Raja Rajeshwari is a 2001 Tamil language Hindu devotional film directed by Bharathi Kannan. The film stars Ramya Krishnan, Ramki and Sanghavi, with Banupriya, Nizhalgal Ravi, Vadivelu and Vinu Chakravarthy playing supporting roles. The film was produced by Pushpa Kandaswamy and had a musical score by Deva. The film released on 13 April 2001.

Cast

Ramya Krishnan as Raja Rajeswari 
Ramki as Rasaiyya and Raja (Ravintharnath's son)
Sanghavi as Meenakshi
Banupriya as Goddess Shakti and Vekkaliamman(Kali)
Vadivelu as Minor Pandiyan and Nattamai
Nizhalgal Ravi as Businessman Ravintharnath
Ponnambalam as Sangkara
Vinu Chakravarthy as Paampu Sithar "Rajalingam Swami"
Delhi Ganesh as Rajeswari's father
Malaysia Vasudevan as Sinthala karai Vekkali Amman priest and Meenakshi's father
Thyagu as Prabakaran
Pallavi as Rajeswari's mother
K. R. Vatsala as Sangkara's wife
Indhu as Katuvasi Girl who killed Prabakaran
V. K. Ramasamy as Jothidar
S. N. Parvathy as Rajeswari's grandmother
Singamuthu as Katuvasi leader
Lekhasri as Katuvasi Girl with Vadivelu
Bonda Mani
"Bayilvaan" Krishnasamy Thevar
Bharathi Kannan
Nalini guest role in song ("Maruvathoor Om Sakthi")

Production
A stint of shooting took place at Kuttralam  near Tenkasi and at Injimedu Sivalayam  where some scenes were picturised on Ramki and Ramya Krishnan. There is a song written by lyricist Kalidas which had the names of 165 Goddesses. This devotional song is picturised at 108 'Amman' temples of Tamil Nadu, with Nalini featuring in the song "Maruvathoor Om Sakthi". This song was sung by renowned playback singer K. S. Chithra.

Soundtrack

Music was composed by Deva. This is the first devotional movie for Deva.  This soundtrack has 6 songs. The lyrics were penned by Kalidasan, Viveka, Bharathiputhiran, Seerkazhi Govindarajan (Slokam) and Muralikrishnan (Slokam).

References

External links

geocities.com, "SRI RAJA RAJESWARI A movie review by Balaji Balasubramaniam"
broadband.bigflix.com, Sree Raja Rajeswari film details

2001 films
2000s Tamil-language films
Hindu devotional films
Films scored by Deva (composer)
Films directed by Bharathi Kannan